is a 2009 Japanese fantasy slice of life anime series produced by OLM's Team Kamei division, officially based on the Tamagotchi digital pet jointly created by Bandai and WiZ. It is directed by Jōji Shimura (Pokémon) and written by Aya Matsui (Boys Over Flowers), with character designs done by Sayuri Ichiishi, Shouji Yasukazu and Miwa Sakai. It officially aired on TV Tokyo and other affiliate stations in Japan from 12 October 2009 to 3 September 2012, lasting for seven seasons.

The series is the third Tamagotchi anime produced since Saa Ikou! Tamagotchi and a follow-up to the movie Tamagotchi: Happiest Story in the Universe!. After the series' airing, it has gained three anime sequels, two manga adaptations and ten light novel adaptations by Kadokawa Shoten. Although several episodes of the first Tamagotchi anime have been dubbed in select countries, the full anime has never aired outside of Japan. The series ended in March 2015 and was replaced by Kamisama Minarai: Himitsu no Cocotama on its initial timeslot.

Story arcs

The anime is divided into three official arcs, the Tamagotchi Town Chapter for the first series, the Dream Town Chapter for the 2nd series and the Tamagottsun Chapter for the 3rd series. Alongside the main story, several mini-segments were officially shown throughout the anime, with each segment differs from season to season.

 (Eps 1–143)

 (Eps 144–221)
The second chapter of the series consisting of the Yume Kira Arc (Tamagotchi! Yume Kira Dream), focusing on Yumemitchi and Kiraritchi's dream on becoming idols and the Dreambakutchi Arc (Tamagotchi! Miracle Friends) which focuses on Miraitchi and Clulutchi's desire on returning to the future.

Tamagottsun Chapter (Eps 222-271)
The third chapter focusing on meeting and reunion of the characters from the past series, as well as two new characters, Neenetchi and Orenetchi. It focuses more on the interaction between friends of both towns.

Plot
Tamagotchi!
Following the events of Tamagotchi: Happiest Story in the Universe!, Mametchi, Memetchi, Kuchipatchi, and all other Tamagotchi Planet residents move on with their daily lives. However, a very famous Tamagotchi idol named Lovelin moves to Tamagotchi Town to host a footrace. The following day, at school, a shy, yet sweet new girl named Lovelitchi came to class. Little were her classmates aware that she was actually Lovelin. Poor experiences in prior schools caused Lovelitchi to decide to keep her Lovelin identity a secret when transferring to Tamagotchi School. After Mametchi told Lovelitchi he sees her as a Tama-Friend, she soon gets nervous due to the fact that Tama-Friends are never dishonest with each other. On Mametchi's birthday, Lovelitchi announced that she was, indeed, Lovelin. She feared that her newly made friendships would come to an end, but everyone was quick to forgive her, and she was relieved. Daily life continued from that point until a legend about "The Kuchipatchi of Truth" was learned about by Mametchi, Memetchi, and Kuchipatchi. It caused a variety of shenanigans, included being teleported back in time and Lovelitchi's cell phone, Telelin, coming to life. Not long after the legend of The Kuchipatchi of Truth was discovered, an outgoing violinist named Melodytchi moves to Tamagotchi Town. Lovelitchi quickly became friends with her and they became an idol and violinist duet, performing many songs together. Not too long afterward, a bright and optimistic fashion designer named Moriritchi moves in and quickly became Tama-Friends with the cast, especially Lovelitchi and Melodytchi. Shortly after, a human girl named Tomomi arrives on Tamagotchi Planet following a malfunction from one of Mametchi's inventions. At that time, a new conflict unfolds; the legend of the Tama-Hearts. These mythical hearts were floating about on Tamagotchi Planet, and if they weren't found in time, Tamagotchi Planet would face a permanent curse. Mametchi created Tama-Profies, devices that could store the Tama-Hearts shortly after they were uncovered, and gave them to Lovelitchi and Melodytchi. Every time a Tama-Heart was found, Lovelitchi and Melodytchi would take out their Tama-Profies and store the Tama-Heart inside. At one time around that time, a mysterious Tamagotchi named Kizunatchi got out of the devices and offered to help with the search. Not long after, Tomomi leaves to return to the Earth and a new Tamagotchi girl with a massive crush on Mametchi, Himespetchi, arrives and agrees to help with the search. With all the Tama-Hearts eventually found and stored in the Tama-Profies, citizens of Tamagotchi Town were soon turning into eggs. This was the beginning for what may be a permanent curse in Tamagotchi Planet, and if the Tama-Hearts weren't returned to their respective pillars on Heart Island in time, a rather unhappy ending is rest assured. Luckily, The Tamagotchis make it to Heart Island just before the curse gets any worse and manage to store the Tama-Hearts in their proper pillars. The sky then darkens, making them think something awful is bound to happen. Mametchi, Lovelitchi, Melodytchi, Memetchi, Kuchipatchi, and Himespetchi each made their hopes on the Tamagotchi Planet being Okay and the Egg curse to being stopped. Kizunatchi, only able to do so much to stop the curse, descended in a manner that saddened her Tama-Friends and made them run towards her, screaming her name. Kizunatchi soon changed appearance and ended the egg curse once and for all. Everyone was turned back to their regular selves and, after a tearful farewell to Kizunatchi, everything went back to normal. Ms. Perfect called Mametchi, Memetchi, and Kuchipatchi, and announced that the three Tamagotchis have won the Robotic Soccer Tournament and that they would be transferring to Dream Town in light of their Victory. The entire class was surprised, especially Mametchi, Memetchi, and Kuchipatchi. Makiko remarked that the three will need to leave Tamagotchi Town, making Himespetchi tear up in the thought that her love was leaving.

Tamagotchi! Yume Kira Dream
Following Ms. Perfect's announcement, Mametchi, Memetchi, and Kuchipatchi take to Dream Town by plane. Each of them were given Home-Stay residences by the Principle of Dream School. Kuchipatchi's was a fancy restaurant named Dream Hakken, and Memetchi's was a beautiful salon called Salon de Dream. While this seemed like paradise for Kuchipatchi, Memetchi, and Mametchi's home stay wasn't quite the same way. He did a homestay in a garage with an elder Tamagotchi named Ikaritchi, who didn't think very fond of him. Meanwhile, shifting to another story, Yumemitchi, the sweet daughter of a wealthy Tamagotchi family, meets up with her best Tama-Friend, Kiraritchi. The girls achieve so much more together than either one could on their own, and they share a dream; to become famous idols, which was inspired by a duet called D2. Yumemitchi and Kiraritchi see D2 as role models, and after dancing and singing to help get a lion's thorn out of its paw at a circus, a fortune-telling Tamagotchi gives them mythical bags called Yume Kira Bags, which must be used with careful consideration and must be kept secret from other Tamagotchis. Not long afterward, a surprise awaits Mametchi and friends; Himespetchi returns to reunite with her crush and to fulfill her dream of being Mametchi's bride. The Yume Kira Bags cause Yumemitchi and Kiraritchi to undergo disguise and assist other Tamagotchis with tight situations. One Christmas in Dream Town, a Tamagotchi named Yumecantchi emerges from the bags to help the two after Yumemitchi wished for a Tama-Pet of her own. While Yumemitchi admires her cute charms, Kiraritchi thinks it is an overreaction. Not long after, Mametchi refused to take any more of Ikaritchi's mistreatment for him and ran away, trying to find a new homestay. The next day, a friendly pianist named Pianitchi came to Dream Town to reunite with her mother, Cafe Mama, who runs Music Cafe. She befriended Mametchi and helped him change Ikaritchi's ways. After Ikaritchi was reminded about a childhood memory picking apples with a friend, he finally displays his courteous side to Mametchi, and parted Dream Town to sell the apples. Mametchi has since done a homestay at Music Cafe with Pianitchi. Yumemitchi, Kiraritchi, Memetchi, Pianitchi, and Himespetchi soon formed a band called the Kira Kira Girls. After an important performance, Dream Town learned that Himespetchi had to leave under her parents' request. After a tearful farewell, a talkative make-up artist named Coffretchi moved in and agreed to take Himespetchi's place in the Kira Kira Girls' band. Later on, after Yumemitchi and Kiraritchi make frequent use of the Yume Kira Bag, a Tamagotchi named Nandetchi notices the true identities and decided to take photos of them and show them to Dream School, much to the girls' humiliation. After reconsolidation, Nandetchi tore up the photos. Yumemitchi and Kiraritchi then learned it was time to return the Yume Kira Bags and Yumecantchi back to the fortune teller that gave them the items. Not long afterward, Yumemitchi and Kiraritchi then leave Dream Town and go to Melody Land to study idolism and make their dream come true.

Tamagotchi! Miracle Friends
Sometime after Yumemitchi and Kiraritchi pursuit their dream at a new destination, a new story is to be told, and this one is about time. Two Twin sisters were Home sweet Home in Dream Town of the Future. Miraitchi, the one-day older twin, is a little more sarcastic, which Clulutchi, the one-day younger twin, is a little more serious. One day, a mysterious face that calls himself X-Kamen lets loose eight mythical Tama-Pets called Dreambakutchis. The father of the twins, Doctor Future, orders them to go retrieve the Dreambakutchis. Miraitchi and Clulutchi use pocket designers, devices that provide outfits necessary for fulfilling tasks and assignments, to give Miraitchi wings and Clulutchi a hoverboard. While Miraitchi enjoyed flying, Clulutchi feared it. Despite different receptions on taking to the skies, the twins retrieve most of the Dreambakutchis. However, Purplebakutchi, the only one still flying, does something which causes Watchlin, the living watch owned by the twins, to malfunction and send everyone back in time. At that time frame, Mametchi, Memetchi, Kuchipatchi, Pianitchi and Coffretchi were doing homework. That evening, both of the twins were famished, so they headed over to Music Cafe and were warmly welcomed by Mametchi and Pianitchi. Miraitchi and Clulutchi made a request for Mametchi and Tama-Friends; to assist them in getting back the Dreambakutchis so they can go back home, and all 5 Tamagotchis agreed. X-Kamen was still as much of an obstacle in the present as he was in the future. For the time being, Miraitchi and Clulutchi both attended Dream School, when a mysterious boy named Smartotchi was also attending. Pianitchi was quite fond of Smartotchi due to his exceptional piano playing, but little were the Tamagotchis aware that he was X-Kamen in a "normal" disguise. Miraitchi and Clulutchi also wanted to become fashion designers and did a homestay with Madamtchi, owner of the miracle shop, as a result. Smartotchi eventually informed Miraitchi, Clulutchi and friends that he is actually X-Kamen, and turned from a foe to a friend. Not long after, a cheerful young girl named Candy Paku Paku, a close friend of the twins, also teleported to the past and agreed to help find the Dreambakutchis. After all 8 were found, Miraitchi, Clulutchi, Smartotchi and Candy Paku Paku, despite being reluctant to bid farewell to their friends, did so and returned to the future. .

GO-GO Tamagotchi!
Every thousand years on Tamagotchi Planet, continents collide in an event called the Tamagottssun, causing Tamagotchi Town and Dream Town to fuse as "DoriTama Town". Mametchi, Memetchi and Kuchipatchi reunited with Lovelitchi, Melodytchi, Moriritchi, Himespetchi, Yumemitchi, Kiraritchi and numerous other characters that left previously. Miraitchi, Clulutchi and Candy Paku Paku also return to the past to reunite, but Smartotchi didn't for unknown reasons. A massive reunion took place as the Tamagotchis learn about the legends of the Tamagottssun in a wonderful world. Towards Tamagottssun's conclusion, though, something tragic happens; The Tamagotchi Planet itself is crying, limiting the supply of water available. If Tamagotchi Planet wasn't cheered up in time, it would be a permanent drought and the Tamagotchi species would become extinct because just like humans, Tamagotchis need water to survive. Luckily, with a lot of work and effort, Tamagotchi Planet cheered up, Tamagotchi Town and Dream Town returned to their normal, non-fused statuses and everyone was home with their families. That, however, didn't stop Mametchi from creating his most developed invention ever; the DoriTama Rainbow. It is a special flying submarine-like vehicle that permitted transportation all across Tamagotchi Planet, meaning that the bonds the citizens of Tamagotchi Town made with the citizens of Dream Town and vice versa can last forevermore. After flashbacks from several episodes from the past few seasons, Mametchi and all his Tama-Friends thanked the viewers for watching and everyone waved goodbye to the viewers to show that the anime has officially ended.

Development

The series was officially meant as a follow-up to the previous series Let's Go! Tamagotchi, uniting the staff from OLM's Team Kamei division, who produced the two movie adaptations. The official voice actors from the movies reprise their roles in the new series with the format of the anime has two stories per one episode, which became full episodes on the later years. The series ran from October 2009 to 3 September 2012 lasting up to 143 episodes.

One of the locations of the anime, the Tamagotchi Street, or Tama-Street for short is officially based on the real-life Takeshita Street in Harajuku, Tokyo, where the Tamagotchi Department Store is found. Production staff do a location research of the place and transitioned it into the Anime during development.

Starting Episode 144 in 2012, Team Kamei went on to develop the second series , focusing on the three main characters studying abroad in Dream Town and the lives of both Yumemitchi and Kiraritchi who dream of becoming idols one day. The second series aired from 10 September 2012 to 29 August 2013. From November 2013 to December 2014, Bandai America divided and dubbed the first 7 episodes of Yume Kira Dream as a series of 14 webisodes for the Tamagotchi Friends website. In 2013, Team Wasaki replaced Team Kamei on the anime's production to produce the third series , that aired from 5 September 2013 to 27 March 2014 starting with Episode 193. It focuses on the twins Miraritchi and Clulutchi who must search for the Dreambakutchis for them to return to the future.

In 2014, the fourth and final series,  is produced, revolving around the reunion between characters from Tamagotchi Town and Dream Town after the Tamagottsun event, fusing both towns into DoriTama Town. The series began airing on 3 April 2014 starting with Episode 222.

Media

Anime
The first anime series officially aired in all TX Network Stations, including TV Tokyo and TV Osaka from 12 October 2009 to 3 September 2012, replacing both the Japanese broadcast of Lilo & Stitch: The Series and Hikaru no Go on their respected timeslots. It also aired in the Japanese Pay-for-View channel Animax. The series gained its official English broadcast in Australia and aired in the TV network GO! (Only the first 26 episodes were dubbed in English, and it isn't likely that dubbing will continue, as GO! no longer airs Tamagotchi!) and also aired in Hong Kong and Taiwan through TVB and YoYo TV. It also aired in the Philippines through GMA Network.

The second series titled  first began its airing from 10 September 2012 to 29 August 2013. The series changed timeslot on 25 March 2013, being replaced with the show Why Did You Come to Japan? to its new timeslot on 4 April 2013 Thursday. Bandai America divided and dubbed the first seven episodes of this series as webisodes for the Tamagotchi Friends website (There is a total of 14 webisodes, and every two contain a scene from one of the first seven Tamagotchi! Yume Kira Dream episodes.)

The third series,  officially aired from 5 September 2013 to 27 March 2014 with a total of 29 episodes, making it the shortest Tamagotchi season ever released. The fourth and final series titled  began airing on 3 April 2014 and ended on 26 March 2015. No new episodes have been broadcast since then, although a rebroadcast series called Tamagotchi! Tama Tomo Daishū GO! began airing on 2 April 2015 and ended on 29 September 2015. This marked the first and only series in the franchise to include Live-Action Segments.

A short film based on the series, Eiga Tamagotchi: Himitsu no Otodoke Dai Saisuken!, which is set at another universe and was released along with Himitsu no Cocotama movie on 28 April 2017. The short film centers around the Tama-Friends, who are assigned to deliver a package to the Gotchi King, when a giant mechanical claw controlled by the Spacy Brothers intervenes with the delivery. The short was also Nijifuwatchi's first appearance and the first movie was never written by Aya Matsui. However, this short film will lend the revival of the anime is still unknown, due to the show being in limbo.

Each of the anime series were released in DVD by Bandai Visual in Japan. The first series is also released online through the streaming service Bandai Channel, focusing on each mini-arc.

After the show ended, reruns of both Tamagotchi! Yume Kira Dream and Go-Go Tamagotchi! continued to air on Animax in Japan until mid 2015 and late 2015 respectively,  at the earliest.

Cancellation
Before the anime was officially ended as for March 2015 and was replaced by Kamisama Minarai: Himitsu no Cocotama in its initial timeslot, the franchise notice that the "Tamagotchi 4U" sales went downhill as expected. Aya Matsui, the main writer of the series already left the team as well. However, the franchise still made more merchandise even though the anime ended.

Manga
A manga series based on the series titled  is serialized on Shogakukan's Shojo Magazine Pucchigumi from February 2010 to December 2011. The Manga is written and illustrated by Yasukon and three tankōbon volumes were collected. A second manga series titled  is also done by Yasukon and serialized in Pucchigumi. Only one tankōbon volume is released.

Light novel
An ongoing Light Novel series based on the anime series is released as part of Kadokawa's Tsubasa Bunko label on 11 March 2011, written by both Aya Matsui and Anna Mari. The adaptation only adapts certain arcs and episodes of the anime series.

Music
The music of the anime is officially composed by the group Aozora, who composes songs on various Bandai Commercials.

The first anime had 4 opening and 7 ending songs. The first opening song is titled , on which has 7 Versions: The first version is sung by Yuria Nara, the second version is done by Kei Shindo, Yuko Sanpei and Nanae Kato, the third version is done by Ryoka Yuzuki, Akemi Okamura and Asami Yaguchi, the fourth version is done by Yuko Gibu, Satomi Kōrogi and Rie Kugimiya, the fifth version is done by Tomoko Kaneda, Hinako Sasaki and Kei Shindo, the sixth version is done by Rie Kugimiya, Satomi Kōrogi, Kana Uetake and Yuko Sanpei and the seventh is done by the main cast of the series. The second opening song is titled Like & Peace!, the third opening is titled  and the fourth opening is titled I★my★me★mine, all performed by Dream5. The first ending song is titled  by Shōko Haida, the second ending is titled  by mao, the third ending theme is titled  by both Kei Shindo and Yuko Sanpei, the fourth ending is titled Smiling! by Lay, the fifth ending is titled 
 by Shu-I, the sixth ending is titled  by Asian Engineer and the seventh ending is titled  by Dream5.

The second series only had two opening and two ending themes. The first opening song is titled  by Dream5 and the second opening theme is titled  by both Misato Fukuen and Megumi Toyoguchi under the band name .

The third series only had two songs prior to its short run. The first opening is titled  by Emiri Katō and Chiwa Saitō and the ending theme is titled  by Rie Kugimiya.

The fourth series also has two theme songs. The opening song is titled  by hitomi for the first 25 episodes and by Rie Kugimiya for the rest of the season. The first ending theme is titled RAINBOW by Hitomi and the second ending is titled Baby I by Ariana Grande featuring Taro Hakase.

Video games
Several Video Games based on the anime were all officially released by Bandai Namco Games in Japan. The first game of the series,  is first released on 5 November 2009 for the Nintendo DS. The second game in the series,  is released on 17 July 2010 as part of the Corner Shop series. The third game,  is released on 11 November 2010. The fourth,  is released on 10 November 2011.

The game is a remake of the first Tamagotchi Corner Shop game with characters from the Anime version. The second game in the series,  is released on 22 November 2012. It is the first game to include characters from the Yume Kira Dream series. The third game  is released on 23 May 2013. The fourth game in series,  is released on 7 November 2013. It is the first game to include characters from the Miracle Friends series. The current game of the series,  is released on 24 April 2014.

References

General
http://tamagotch.channel.or.jp/tama_anime/

Specific

External links
  Official Website
  Official TV Tokyo Website
 
 
 
 
 

Tamagotchi
2009 anime television series debuts
2012 anime television series debuts
2013 anime television series debuts
2014 anime television series debuts
2015 anime television series debuts
2010 manga
2013 manga
Manga series
OLM, Inc.
Shogakukan manga
Shōjo manga
TV Tokyo original programming
Works based on Bandai Namco video games